Events of 2019 in Spain.

Incumbents 
Monarch: Felipe VI
Prime Minister: Pedro Sánchez

Events 

 16 February - Prime Minister Sánchez announced a snap election for 28 April 2019, After the 2019 General State Budget was voted down by the Congress of Deputies on 13 February 2019.
 14 October - Supreme Court makes public the sentence of the trial of Catalonia independence leaders.
 24 October - Former dictator Francisco Franco is exhumed from Valle de los Caídos.

Deaths

January
 January 1
 Joan Guinjoan, Spanish composer and pianist (b. 1931)
 José Antonio Pujante, Spanish politician (b. 1964)
 January 3 – José Vida Soria, Spanish jurist and politician (b. 1937)
 January 4 – Francisco Olivencia, Spanish lawyer and politician (b. 1934)
 January 17
 Vicente Álvarez Areces, 75, President of Asturias (1999-2011), Senator (since 2011) and Mayor of Gijón (1987-1999)
 Gil Carlos Rodríguez Iglesias, 72, President of the European Court of Justice (1994–2003).
 January 20 – Lolo Rico, 83, television director and journalist
 January 24
 Elio Berhanyer, 89, fashion designer
 Fernando Sebastián Aguilar, Spanish cardinal (b. 1929)
 January 25 – Jaume Traserra Cunillera, 84, Bishop of Solsona (2001-2010)

February
 February 4 – Isacio Calleja, Spanish footballer (b. 1936)
 February 28 – Xabier Arzalluz, Spanish lawyer and academic (b. 1932)

March
 March 3
 Martí Galindo, Spanish actor (b. 1937)
 José García Ladrón de Guevara, Spanish politician (b. 1929)
 March 8 – Jaume Muxart, Spanish painter (b. 1922)
 March 11 – Martín Chirino, Spanish sculptor (b. 1925)
 March 15 – Juan Manuel Arza Muñuzuri, Spanish politician and lawyer (b. 1932)
 March 24 – Pancracio Celdrán, Spanish professor, intellectual and journalist (b. 1942)
 March 29 – Josep Esteve i Soler, Spanish pharmaceutical executive (b. 1930)
 March 30 – Paloma Cela, Spanish actress (b. 1943)
 March 31 – José Antonio Gurriarán, Spanish journalist (b. 1938)

April
 April 13 – Neus Català, Spanish  Holocaust survivor, anti-Franco militant and member of the French Resistance (b. 1915)
 April 24 – Conrado San Martín, Spanish actor (b. 1921)
 April 25 – Paloma Tortajada, Spanish broadcaster and journalist (b. 1965)

May
 May 9 – Manuel Giner Miralles, Spanish politician (b. 1926)
 May 10 – Alfredo Pérez Rubalcaba, Spanish politician (b. 1951)
 May 18 – Analía Gadé, Argentine actress (b. 1931)
 May 24 – Manuel Pazos, Spanish footballer (b. 1930)

June
 June 1 – José Antonio Reyes, Spanish footballer (b. 1983
 June 4 – Antoni Roig Muntaner, Spanish chemist and politician (b. 1931)
 June 19 – Rafael de la Sierra, Spanish politician (b. 1948)
 June 22 – Concepción Paredes, Spanish athlete (b. 1970)
 June 30 – Armando Salas, Spanish cartoonist (b. 1946)

July
 July 2 – José Luis Merino, Spanish film writer and director (b. 1927)
 July 4
 Eduardo Fajardo, Spanish actor (b. 1924)
 Arturo Fernández Rodríguez, Spanish actor (b. 1929)
 July 5 – José Muñoz Sánchez, Spanish politician (b. 1962)
 July 21 – José Manuel Estepa Llaurens, Spanish cardinal (b. 1926)

August

September

October

See also

 2019 European Parliament election

References 

 
Spain
2019 in Europe
2010s in Spain
Years of the 21st century in Spain